Vladislav Solanovich (born 25 May 1999) is a Belarusian professional footballer who plays for Belshina Bobruisk.

References

External links 
 
 

1999 births
Living people
People from Babruysk
Sportspeople from Mogilev Region
Belarusian footballers
Association football defenders
FC Belshina Bobruisk players
FC Viktoryja Marjina Horka players